1776 Kuiper, provisional designation , is a dark Eoan asteroid from the outer region of the asteroid belt, approximately 38 kilometers in diameter.

It was discovered on 24 September 1960, by Dutch astronomer couple Ingrid and Cornelis van Houten in collaboration with Dutch–American astronomer Tom Gehrels at the U.S. Palomar Observatory in California, and named after Dutch astronomer Gerard Kuiper.

Orbit and classification 

Kuiper is a member of the Eos family, the largest asteroid family in the outer main belt consisting of nearly 10,000 asteroids. It orbits the Sun in the outer asteroid belt at a distance of 3.1–3.1 AU once every 5 years and 6 months (1,996 days). Its orbit has an eccentricity of 0.01 and an inclination of 9° with respect to the ecliptic.

Palomar–Leiden survey 

The survey designation "P-L" stands for Palomar–Leiden, named after Palomar and Leiden Observatory, which collaborated on the fruitful Palomar–Leiden survey in the 1960s. Gehrels used Palomar's Samuel Oschin telescope (also known as the 48-inch Schmidt Telescope), and shipped the photographic plates to Ingrid and Cornelis van Houten at Leiden Observatory where astrometry was carried out. The trio are credited with the discovery of several thousand minor planets.

Physical characteristics 

According to the surveys carried out by the Infrared Astronomical Satellite IRAS and NASA's Wide-field Infrared Survey Explorer with its subsequent NEOWISE mission, Kuiper measures 36.0 and 40.0 kilometers in diameter, and its surface has a low albedo of 0.033 and 0.054, respectively. Typical value for C-, D- or P-type asteroids in the outer main-belt. However, as of 2017, Kuipers composition, as well as its rotation period and shape remain unknown.

Naming 

This minor planet is named after Dutch–American astronomer Gerard Kuiper (1905–1973), initiator of the Palomar-Leiden survey. He was a well-known authority in the field of planetary science and director at the Lunar and Planetary Laboratory and at Yerkes Observatory. He discovered Miranda and Nereid, satellites of Uranus and Neptune, respectively.

The third zone of the Solar System, the Kuiper belt, is named after him. Also, the Mercurian crater Kuiper, the Martian crater Kuiper and the lunar crater Kuiper all bear his name. The official  was published by the Minor Planet Center on 25 September 1971.

References

External links 
 Asteroid Lightcurve Database (LCDB), query form (info )
 Dictionary of Minor Planet Names, Google books
 Asteroids and comets rotation curves, CdR – Observatoire de Genève, Raoul Behrend
 Discovery Circumstances: Numbered Minor Planets (1)-(5000) – Minor Planet Center
 
 

001776
2520
Discoveries by Cornelis Johannes van Houten
Discoveries by Ingrid van Houten-Groeneveld
Discoveries by Tom Gehrels
Named minor planets
1776 Kuiper
19600924